Robert Storey (11 April 1956 – 21 June 2020) was a Provisional Irish Republican Army (IRA) member from Belfast, Northern Ireland. Prior to an 18-year conviction for possessing a rifle, he also spent time on remand for a variety of charges and in total served 20 years in prison. He also played a key role in the Maze Prison escape, the biggest prison break in British penal history.

Early life
The family was originally from the Marrowbone area, on the Oldpark Road in North Belfast. The family had to move when Storey was very young due to Ulster loyalist attacks on the district, moving to Manor Street, an interface area also in North Belfast. Storey's uncle was boxing trainer Gerry Storey and his father, also called Bobby, was involved in the defence of the area in the 1970s when Catholics were threatened by loyalists.

Storey was one of four children. He had two brothers, Seamus and Brian, and a sister Geraldine. Seamus and Bobby senior had been arrested after a raid on their home which uncovered a rifle and a pistol. Bobby senior was later released but Seamus was charged. Seamus escaped from Crumlin Road Prison with eight other prisoners in 1971, they were dubbed the Crumlin Kangaroos.

On his mother Peggy's side of the family there was also a history of republicanism, but Storey said "the dominant influences on" him "were the events that were happening around" him. These included the McGurk's Bar bombing in the New Lodge, some of those killed being people who knew his family, and also Bloody Sunday.  This then led to his attempts to join the IRA.

Storey left school when he was fifteen and went to work with his father selling fruit. At sixteen, he became a member of the IRA.

Prison
On 11 April 1973, his seventeenth birthday, he was interned and held at Long Kesh internment camp. He had been arrested 20 times previous to this but was too young for internment. In October 1974 he took part in the protest at Long Kesh against living conditions where internees set fire to the "cages" in which they were being held. He was released from internment in May 1975. He was arrested on suspicion of a bombing at the Skyways Hotel in January 1976 and a kidnapping and murder in the Andersonstown district of Belfast in March 1976, but was acquitted by the judge at his trial. He was arrested leaving the courthouse and charged with a shooting-related incident. He was released after the case could not be proved, only to be charged with shooting two soldiers in Turf Lodge. Those charges were dropped in December 1977. The same month he was arrested for the murder of a soldier in Turf Lodge, but the charges were also dropped. 

In 1978 Storey was charged in relation to the wounding of a soldier in Lenadoon, but was acquitted at trial due to errors in police procedure. On 14 December 1979, Storey was later arrested in Holland Park, London, with three other IRA members including Gerard Tuite, and charged with conspiring to hijack a helicopter to help Brian Keenan escape from Brixton Prison. Tuite escaped from the same prison prior to the trial, and the other two IRA members were convicted, but Storey was acquitted at the Old Bailey in April 1981. That August, after a soldier was shot, he was arrested in possession of a rifle and was convicted for the first time, being sentenced to eighteen years' imprisonment.

Storey was one of the leaders of the Maze Prison escape in 1983, when 38 republican prisoners broke out of the H-Blocks, the largest prison escape in British penal history and the largest peacetime prison escape in Europe. He was recaptured within an hour, and sentenced to an additional seven years imprisonment. Released in 1994, he was again arrested in 1996 and charged with having personal information about a British Army soldier, and Brian Hutton, the Lord Chief Justice. At his trial at Crumlin Road Courthouse in July 1998, he was acquitted after his defence proved the personal information had previously been published in books and newspapers.

Post-prison
Having spent over twenty years in prison, much of it on remand, his final release was in 1998, and he again became involved in developing republican politics and strategy, eventually becoming the northern chairman of Sinn Féin.

On 11 January 2005 Ulster Unionist Member of Parliament for South Antrim David Burnside told the British House of Commons under parliamentary privilege that Storey was head of intelligence for the IRA.

On 9 September 2015, Storey was arrested and held for two days in connection with the killing of former IRA member Kevin McGuigan the previous month. He was subsequently released without any charges, and his solicitor John Finucane stated Storey would be suing for unlawful arrest.

Death
Storey died in Newcastle upon Tyne, England on 21 June 2020 following an unsuccessful lung transplant surgery. Sinn Féin president Mary Lou McDonald described him as "a great republican" in her tribute. His funeral procession in Belfast on 30 June was attended by over 1,500 people including McDonald, deputy First Minister Michelle O'Neill, and former Sinn Féin president Gerry Adams, but was criticised for breaking social distancing rules implemented in response to the COVID-19 pandemic which, at the time operating in Northern Ireland, limited funeral numbers to no more than 30 mourners.

Cultural references
In the 2017 film Maze dramatising the 1983 prison break, directed by Stephen Burke, Storey was portrayed by Irish actor Cillian O'Sullivan.

References

External links
The Trouble with Guns – journalist Malachi O'Doherty's account of a meeting with Storey in 1995

Escapees from British detention
Irish escapees
1956 births
2020 deaths
People acquitted of murder
Paramilitaries from Belfast
Place of birth missing
Provisional Irish Republican Army members
Republicans imprisoned during the Northern Ireland conflict